Ingrid Jungermann (born August 23, 1977) is an American actress, director, producer, and screenwriter. She is best known for Women Who Kill, her directorial film debut, and web series The Slope and F to 7th.

Career 
Jungermann is originally from Florida and moved to New York City via North Carolina. She graduated from New York University Tisch School of the Arts (NYU), with an MFA. Jungermann was selected one of the "25 New Faces of 2012" by Filmmaker magazine. In 2017, she was a recipient of the Sundance FilmTwo Fellowship.

Jungermann created her breakout web series The Slope with Desiree Akhavan while the two were postgraduate film students at NYU.

Personal life 
Ingrid Jungermann identifies as lesbian and publicly stated that she "does not balk at being called a lesbian filmmaker".

Awards and nominations 
 Independent Spirit Award for Best First Screenplay nomination for Women Who Kill
 Independent Spirit Someone to Watch Award nomination for Women Who Kill
 Tribeca Film Festival Jury Prize for Best Screenplay for Women Who Kill
 WGA Nomination for F to 7th

Filmography

Film

Television

See also
 List of female film and television directors
 List of lesbian filmmakers
 List of LGBT-related films directed by women

References

External links
 

1977 births
Living people
American women film directors
American women film producers
American women screenwriters
American lesbian artists
LGBT film directors
LGBT producers
American LGBT screenwriters
LGBT television directors
American women television directors
American television directors
American women television producers
Actresses from Florida
American people of Swedish descent
21st-century American women writers